= Martin J. De Nys =

Professor of philosophy

- Born: 1945 (age 80–81)

Academic background
- Education: Loyola University Chicago (PhD)
- Thesis: The Hegelian Sources of Marx's Concept of Man (1973)
- Doctoral advisor: Kenneth F. Thompson

Academic work
- Era: Contemporary philosophy
- Region: Western philosophy
- School or tradition: German Idealism
- Institutions: George Mason University

Martin J. De Nys (born 1945) is an emeritus professor at George Mason University.

== Education ==
DeNys received his Ph.D. from Loyola University Chicago on the dissertation "The Hegelian Sources of Marx' Concept of Man" in 1973.

== Selected works ==
- Hegel and Theology. Bloomsbury Academic. 2009. ISBN 978-0-567-03281-2.
- De Nys, Martin (2008). Considering Transcendence: Elements of a Philosophical Theology. Indiana University Press. doi:10.2979/5513.0. ISBN 978-0-253-35245-3.

=== Articles ===
- ""Sense Certainty" and Universality: Hegel's Entrance into the Phenomenology". International Philosophical Quarterly. 18 (4): 445–465. 1978. doi:10.5840/ipq197818445. ISSN 0019-0365.
- De Nys, Martin (1987-07-01). "Speculation and Theonomy at the Close of Hegel's System". Proceedings of the Hegel Society of America. 8: 201–214. doi:10.5840/hsaproceedings1987817.
- Nys, Martin J. De (2005). "Conceiving Divine Transcendence". Owl of Minerva. 36 (2): 111–130. doi:10.5840/owl20053622. ISSN 0030-7580.
- De Nys, Martin J. (2008). "Dimensions of Absolute Knowing". The Review of Metaphysics. 61 (3): 555–576. ISSN 0034-6632. JSTOR 20130977.
